Marie Payet  (born 17 August 1992 in Réunion) is a French singer, model and beauty pageant titleholder who was crowned Miss Réunion 2011 and second runner-up in Miss France 2012, behind Delphine Wespiser.  She went on to place in the top ten in Miss Universe 2012.

Pageantry

Miss Reunion
Marie was crowned Miss Reunion on 16 July 2011. She succeeded Florence Arginthe. She was automatically qualified for the Miss France 2012 pageant.

Miss France
Delphine Wespiser, Miss Alsace 2011, was crowned Miss France 2012, and subsequently competed in Miss World 2012.  Marie —Miss Reunion 2011—placed as 2nd runner-up, earning the right to represent France in Miss Universe 2012 in Las Vegas, USA, on 19 December.

Miss Universe
Marie Payet finished in the top 10 at Miss Universe 2012.

Career

On 12 November 2013 Marie Payet participated at the third season of The Voice's Blind Auditions (French version).

On 1 February 2014 Marie performed This Love (Maroon 5). Unfortunately, none of the coaches chose her.

Discography

Marie Payet's first passion is music. During her reign as Miss Reunion 2011, a famous Reunionese singer called Bernard Joron, leader of the group Ousanousava, write a song for her. This song entitled 'Fleur Créole' is about the beauty of Métis women.

Single
 2012 : Fleur Créole

References

External links
Official Miss France website

1992 births
Living people
French female models
Beauty pageant winners from Réunion
Miss Universe 2012 contestants